Oxycoleini is a tribe of beetles in the subfamily Cerambycinae, now placed in the Stenopterini.

It contained the following genera and species:

 Genus Oxycoleus
 Oxycoleus bicolor (Melzer, 1934)
 Oxycoleus brasiliensis (Tippmann, 1953)
 Oxycoleus carinatipennis (Zajciw, 1964)
 Oxycoleus clavipes Lacordaire, 1869
 Oxycoleus culicinus (Bates, 1870)
 Oxycoleus cyaneus Martins & Galileo, 2005
 Oxycoleus flavipes Martins & Galileo, 2006
 Oxycoleus gahani (Gounelle, 1911)
 Oxycoleus gratiosus (Bates, 1885)
 Oxycoleus laetus Julio, 1997
 Oxycoleus obscurus Julio, 1997
 Oxycoleus piceus Giesbert, 1993
 Oxycoleus ruficollis (Zajciw, 1964)
 Oxycoleus tristis (Melzer, 1933)
 Genus Oxylopsebus
 Oxylopsebus brachypterus Clarke, 2008

References

Cerambycinae
Obsolete animal taxa